Özgür Özdemir (born 10 January 1995) is a Turkish professional footballer who plays as a defender for Turgutluspor.

Club career
In September 2019, Özdemir joined Adanaspor. In January 2020 it was confirmed, that he had left the club by mutual consent.

He returned to Sonnenhof Großaspach in July 2020.

International career
Özdemir was born in Germany to Turkish parents, and is a youth international for the Turkish Football Federation.

References

External links

1995 births
German people of Turkish descent
Footballers from Frankfurt
Living people
German footballers
Turkish footballers
Turkey youth international footballers
Turkey under-21 international footballers
Association football defenders
1. FC Nürnberg II players
1. FC Nürnberg players
SV Ried players
SG Sonnenhof Großaspach players
1. FC Kaiserslautern players
Adanaspor footballers
Turgutluspor footballers
Regionalliga players
Austrian Football Bundesliga players
3. Liga players
Oberliga (football) players
TFF First League players
TFF Second League players
TFF Third League players
Turkish expatriate footballers
German expatriate footballers
Turkish expatriate sportspeople in Austria
German expatriate sportspeople in Austria
Expatriate footballers in Austria